Bread and butter may refer to:

Cuisine
 Bread, paired with butter, a staple of western diet.
 Bread and butter pickles
 Bread and butter pudding, a British dish
 Butterbrot, a German dish
 Smörgås, a Swedish dish
 Smørrebrød, a Danish dish
 Tartine, a dish originating in France and found in many other Francophone countries
 Voileipä, a Finnish dish
 Brun maska, an Iranian dish, served in Irani cafes in Mumbai
 Bread and butter cut, a cut of chuck steak
 Bread+Butter, a restaurant at The Borgata

Music
 "Bread and Butter" (song), also covered by Devo and used as the theme for the TV series Baby Talk
 Bread & Butter (album), a 1964 debut album by The Newbeats
 , a Japanese folk duo, written for by Akiko Kobayashi
 "Bread and Butter", a song by Larry Clinton, the flip side on "How High the Moon"
 "Bread and Butter", a song by Ivor Cutler on the album Velvet Donkey
 "Bread and Butter", a release by Goodlyfe Crew
 "Bread And Butter", a single by Robert John
 "Bread 'n Butter", a song by The Lovables and Bobby Sheen
 "Bread & Butter", a song by The Roots on the album Game Theory
 "Bread & Butter", a song by Beanie Sigel on the album The B. Coming
 "Bread and Butter", a song by The Waitresses on the album I Could Rule the World If I Could Only Get the Parts
 Japanese city pop duo Bread and Butter

Art and media
 Bread N' Butter, a TV series
 Bread and Butter, a 1914 play by Eugene O'Neill
 Bread and Butter, a 1966 play by Cecil Philip Taylor
 Bread and Butter, a 2014 American movie by Liz Manashil
 "The Bread And Butter", a Flying the Flag episode
 Bread and Butter Collective, a member of the Representing NYC artists' network
 "El pan nuestro" ("Bread and butter"), a poem by José Pedroni

Other uses
 Bread and Butter tradeshow (fashion) at Berlin
 Bread and Butter (playboating)
 Bread and butter (superstition)
 Bread and butter construction, a type of wooden ship model construction
 Linaria vulgaris, a plant
 Bread and butter, a baseball term
 Bread and butter appearance, a medical condition caused by uremic pericarditis
 "Bread and Butter", an idiom that alludes to the basic food, with the meaning of an essential, sustaining element, often of a business or other endeavor

See also
 Bread and butter state,  a nickname for Minnesota
 "Bread and Butter Man", a song by The Nashville Teens
 Bread and Butter Women, a 1930s play by Patrick White
 His Bread and Butter, a 1916 film by Triangle Film Corporation